Ukrainian Federation of Rhythmic Gymnastics is a national governing body of rhythmic gymnastics in Ukraine.

In Ukraine the sport is known rather as Artistic Gymnastics.

The major training center is the Deriugins School of Gymnastics in Kyiv.

See also 
Deriugins School

Gymnastics in Ukraine
Gymnastics
Collective members of the National Olympic Committee of Ukraine